Daniel Agbloe Adzigodi Lomotey (born 16 August 1999) is a Ghanaian footballer who plays as a forward.

Club career

WAFA 
Lomotey began his career at Ghana Premier League club West African Football Academy. He has been the club's main striker since 2017. He scored four goals, including a first-half hat-trick, during a 5–4 win against Medeama in the 2020–2021 season. Another strike against Asante Kotoko took his goalscoring total to a league-best eight in nine games. He reportedly signed a two-and-a-half year deal with Tunisian side AS Soliman, which was confirmed by their manager Yemen Zelfani, but ultimately fell through after disagreements between the clubs.

ES Sétif
On January 29, 2021, Lomotey signed a three-year contract with Algerian club ES Sétif.

International career 
Lomotey played for the Ghana U20s in the 2019 Africa U-20 Cup of Nations, scoring a brace against Burkina Faso in Ghana's opening match.

References

External links
 

Living people
1999 births
Ghanaian footballers
Ghana under-20 international footballers
Association football forwards
West African Football Academy players
Ghana Premier League players
Expatriate footballers in Algeria
ES Sétif players
Ghanaian expatriate sportspeople in Algeria
Algerian Ligue Professionnelle 1 players
Ghanaian expatriate footballers